Leslie P. Willcocks is a Professor of Technology Work and Globalization and governor of the Information Systems and Innovation Group at the London School of Economics. He is considered an authority in the field of Outsourcing and recipient of the PricewaterhouseCoopers/Michael Corbett Associates World Outsourcing Achievement Award for his contribution to the field.

See also 

Frank Land

References

External links
Professor Leslie Willcocks

Living people
Year of birth missing (living people)
Academics of the London School of Economics